The Eleventh Commandment (Jedanaesta zapovijed) is a Croatian film directed by Vanča Kljaković. It stars Dragomir Bojanić and Vesna Malohodzic.  It was released in 1970.

References

External links
 

1970 films
1970s Croatian-language films
Jadran Film films
Croatian drama films
1970 drama films
Yugoslav drama films
Films set in Yugoslavia